Non-ministerial government departments (NMGDs) are a type of department of the United Kingdom government that deal with matters for which direct political oversight has been judged unnecessary or inappropriate. They are headed by senior civil servants. Some fulfil a regulatory or inspection function, and their status is therefore intended to protect them from political interference.  Some are headed by a permanent office holder, such as a Permanent Secretary or Second Permanent Secretary.

Overview
The status of an NMGD varies considerably from one to another. For example:
 Senior officials in HM Revenue and Customs work closely with cabinet ministers. Its key policies are set each year in the Finance Act. However, neither ministers nor Parliament can interfere in day-to-day taxation decisions.
 A number of NMGDs are highly independent bodies; for example the Charity Commission, Ofsted and economic regulators such as the Competition and Markets Authority or the Postal Services Commission. These bodies are "creatures of statute": – that is they implement legislation which they have no power to change. Their political independence is assured by providing that they have the status of government departments, but are accountable only to Parliament and the courts. Their budgets are usually set by the Treasury, not by the department which set them up, and they are often funded by licence fees paid by the industries which they regulate.
 The Food Standards Agency is an NMGD which was created by merging two large parts of the Departments of Health and what was then the Ministry of Agriculture, Fisheries and Food. The aim was to reassure the public (after the BSE/vCJD crisis) that decisions about food safety would in future be taken by an independent body free of political control. Because the FSA was designed to take politics out of food safety, it does not seek ministerial approval for its actions.

List of non-ministerial departments
A list of NMGDs is maintained by the Cabinet Office, which  states that the following 20 are in existence:

Charity Commission for England and Wales
Competition and Markets Authority
Crown Prosecution Service
Food Standards Agency
Forestry Commission
Government Actuary's Department
Government Legal Department
His Majesty's Land Registry
His Majesty's Revenue and Customs
The National Archives
National Crime Agency
National Savings and Investments
Office for Standards in Education, Children's Services and Skills (Ofsted)
Office of Gas and Electricity Markets (Ofgem)
Office of Qualifications and Examinations Regulation (Ofqual)
Office of Rail and Road
Serious Fraud Office
Supreme Court of the United Kingdom
UK Statistics Authority
Water Services Regulation Authority (Ofwat)

References

Government institutions
Lists of government agencies by country
Political terminology
Departments of the Government of the United Kingdom